Al-Masyoun is an upscale neighborhood in Ramallah in the West Bank

In the first decade of the 21st century this "fashionable" neighborhood experienced a major building boom that included new condominiums, upscale stores and upscale restaurants such as Orjuwan. and the restaurant Tropicana

References

Ramallah